Ariel Enrique Holan (born 14 September 1960) is an Argentine professional football manager of Universidad Católica.

Field hockey career
Holan was born in Lomas de Zamora, in the Buenos Aires Province. Despite stating that his childhood passion was football, he started his career playing field hockey for Lomas Athletic Club. He quit his playing career in 1979, while at San Martín, following the death of his father.

In 1976, aged only 16, Holan took over Lomas' women's B-team, remaining in charge for three years before moving to Club Alemán. After eight years, he was appointed coach of Olivos' women team, being in charge for three seasons.

In 1990, Holan was Gustavo Paolucci's assistant at the Argentina women's national team for the year's World Cup. After the end of the tournament, he returned to Lomas, now as coach of the women's main squad.

Holan subsequently worked with Banfield, San Fernando and Gimnasia y Esgrima de Buenos Aires before taking over Uruguay women's national team in 2003. At the 2003 Pan American Games held in Santo Domingo, his side won the Bronze medal after losing the semifinals to champions Argentina.

Football career

Early career
In 2003, after attending soccer clinics in Pennsylvania and Atlantic City, Holan was appointed Jorge Burruchaga's assistant at Arsenal de Sarandí. He continued to work with Burrruchaga in the following years, at Estudiantes, Independiente, Banfield and back at Arsenal.

In 2011, Holan took over Argentinos Juniors' youth categories. On 26 June 2011, he was named Matías Almeyda's assistant at River Plate, and was a part of the club's staff during the promotion back to the top tier. He also worked as Almeyda's assistant at Banfield.

Defensa y Justicia
On 11 June 2015, Holan was named Defensa y Justicia manager, replacing José Oscar Flores. Earning plaudits for the team's performances, he led the club to a Copa Sudamericana qualification (the club's first ever international tournament), but resigned on 14 November 2016.

Independiente
On 29 December 2016, Holan was appointed manager of Independiente, in the place of fired Gabriel Milito. Roughly one year later, he lifted the 2017 Copa Sudamericana after defeating Flamengo at the Maracanã Stadium.

On 20 December 2017, Holan announced that he would not renew his contract with Independiente, which was due to expire in the end of the year. Three days later, however, he signed a new contract until the end of 2018.

On 27 June 2018, Holan extended his contract with Independiente until 2021. On 10 July of the following year, he left the club on a mutual agreement.

Universidad Católica
On 16 December 2019, Holan signed a two-year contract with Chilean Primera División side Universidad Católica. He led the side to their Campeonato Nacional accolade in 2020, the club's third consecutive league title, but left the club on 18 February 2021 due to a clause on his contract that allowed him to leave the club at the end of the season.

Santos 
On 22 February 2021, Holan was announced as the new head coach of Brazilian club Santos on a three-year contract. On 26 April 2021, it was announced that he resigned from his post, after an incident with supporters and fireworks in front of his residence. He was the Santos manager for only 12 games (four wins, three ties and five losses).

León 
On 11 May 2021, Holan was announced as the new head coach of Mexican Club León. On 21 April 2022, it was announced that he would no longer manage the club. During his time in the club he was able to win the Leagues Cup final against Seattle Sounders. He also reached the Liga MX Apertura 2021 Final, where the team were runner-ups to the championship.

Return to Universidad Católica
On 30 April 2022, Holan resigned from his position to rejoin Universidad Católica, signing a contract until Dec 31st 2023.

Managerial statistics

Honours

Manager
Independiente
Copa Sudamericana: 2017
Suruga Bank Championship: 2018

Universidad Católica
Chilean Primera División: 2020

References

External links
 Football World Rankings profile
  
 

1960 births
Living people
Argentine people of Czech descent
Sportspeople from Buenos Aires Province
Argentine football managers
Defensa y Justicia managers
Club Atlético Independiente managers
Club Deportivo Universidad Católica managers
Santos FC managers
Club León managers
Argentine Primera División managers
Chilean Primera División managers
Campeonato Brasileiro Série A managers
Liga MX managers
Argentine expatriate football managers
Argentine expatriate sportspeople in Chile
Argentine expatriate sportspeople in Brazil
Argentine expatriate sportspeople in Mexico
Expatriate football managers in Chile
Expatriate football managers in Brazil
Expatriate football managers in Mexico